Apate is a genus of beetles belonging to the family Bostrichidae.

List of species
 Apate approximate Dupont in Dejean, 1833
 Apate armata Dejean, 1833
 Apate barbata Melsheimer, 1806
 Apate coenobita Dejean, 1833
 Apate cribraria Dejean, 1833
 Apate gysselenii Dejean, 1833
 Apate hamaticollis Dejean, 1833
 Apate nana Dejean, 1833
 Apate niger Melsheimer, 1806
 Apate perplexa Dejean, 1833
 Apate quadrispinosa Dejean, 1833
 Apate rufescens Dejean, 1833
 Apate ruficornis Dejean, 1833
 Apate striatus Melsheimer, 1806
 Apate subdentata Dejean, 1833
 Apate substriata Gysselen in Dejean, 1833
 Apate thoracicornis Dejean, 1833
 Apate westermanni Dejean, 1833
 Apate bicolor Fahraeus, 1871 [South Africa]
 Apate bilabiata Lesne, 1909 [East Africa]
 Apate cephalotes (Olivier, 1790:108) [East and South Africa, Madagascar, Comoros, Mauritius, Reunion]
 Apate degener Murray, 1867 [West Africa, East Africa, Zanzibar]
 Apate ecomata Lesne, 1929 [Somalia]
 Apate geayi Lesne, 1907 [Madagascar]
 Apate indistincta Murray, 1867 [East Africa, South Africa, Mauritius]
 Apate lignicolor Fairmaire, 1883a:95 [Africa, Madagascar]
 Apate monachus Fabricius, 1775 [Africa, South Europe, Arabian Peninsula, Central America]
 Apate perniciosa Gistel, 1857
 Apate raricoma Lesne, 1924 [West Africa]
 Apate reflexa Lesne, 1909 [West Africa]
 Apate scoparia Lesne, 1909 [East Africa]
 Apate subcalva Lesne, 1923:60 [West Africa]
 Apate submedia Walker, 1858 [India, Sri Lanka]
 Apate terebrans (Pallas, 1772)
 Apate tuberculosa Gistel, 1848:443 [Brazil]

References
 Bug Guide
 Hallan, J. Synopsis of the described Coleoptera of the World

Bostrichidae